High Point Raceway is a motocross track which is located near Mount Morris, Pennsylvania. The High Point Pro Motocross National, hosted each June, has been a tradition in the region since the track's addition to the Lucas Oil Pro Motocross Championship in 1977.

The facility also hosts a round of the Grand National Cross Country Series, the ATV Motocross National Championship and the DC Vet Homecoming each year, as well as local motocross events.

High Point History
In late 1976, brothers Jack and Carol Holbert reached out to race promoter Dave Coombs with the hopes of building a motocross track on their family farm. Coombs would break ground on the track and undergo later renovations after the Maico Factory Racing team visited the facility and gave their feedback. From there, their basic layout has remained the same over the years with only changes coming within the existing facility. The track has hosted a round of the Lucas Oil Pro Motocross Championship each year since opening in 1977. Additionally, the facility hosted the first-ever AMA National Hare Scramble in 1979 and would see a round of the Grand National Cross Country Series from 1987 until 2002. In 2018, GNCC Racing returned to High Point Raceway as a section of the Mason-Dixon GNCC based out of the adjoining Mathews Farm property.

The name High Point originated from a planned sponsorship with John Penton's Hi Point Products. The sponsorship fell through before finalization, even though signs were already made. The additional letters were added and the High Point Raceway name has remained ever since.

Past Pro Motocross Winners
Since the inaugural event in 1977, the High Point National has been visited by some of the world's top motocross racers and many have logged class wins at the event.

450 Class

250 Class

500 Class

GNCC Overall Winners
Originating as the first-ever AMA National Hare Scramble, High Point Raceway has hosted a total of 18 Grand National Cross Country Series events. After the 1979 event, the venue would not be visited again for a cross country event until being added to the GNCC schedule in 1987 and remained a part of the series until 2002. In 2020, the series would return to High Point for a special event based out of the adjacent Mathews Farm property, traditionally home to the Mason-Dixon GNCC.

GNCC Bike Overall Winners

GNCC ATV Overall Winners

ATV Motocross Past Winners
High Point Raceway has been a frequent stop on the ATV Motocross National Championship schedule for many years, often swapping years with other venues in the area. Not all past results are currently available.

References

External links
 Racer Productions
 High Point National Info

Motorsport venues in Pennsylvania
Buildings and structures in Greene County, Pennsylvania